PPOD or P-Pod may refer to:

 pPod, a mobile structure used by the Horse and Bamboo Theatre
 Poly Picosatellite Orbital Deployer
 Plasma polymerized, 1,7-Octadiene
 People's Party of Dominica

See also 
 POD (disambiguation)